Enshi may refer to:

Enshi Tujia and Miao Autonomous Prefecture, in Hubei, China
Enshi City, capital of Enshi Prefecture